Alija Krnić (born 2 January 1998) is a Montenegrin footballer who plays as a left winger for the Albanian club FK Kukësi.

Club career

Early career
Born in Podgorica, he played with FK Dečić in the 2015–16 Montenegrin First League. Then he moved to Spain, and played one season with AD Almudévar playing in the 2016–17 Tercera División. In summer 2017 he joined Serbian top-level side FK Javor Ivanjica.

Kukësi
On 25 June 2021, Krnić signed a two-year contract with Kategoria Superiore club Kukësi.

References

External links

1998 births
Living people
Footballers from Podgorica
Association football wingers
Montenegrin footballers
Montenegro youth international footballers
Montenegro under-21 international footballers
Montenegrin expatriate footballers
Expatriate footballers in Serbia
Montenegrin expatriate sportspeople in Serbia
Expatriate footballers in Spain
Montenegrin expatriate sportspeople in Spain
Expatriate footballers in Albania
Montenegrin expatriate sportspeople in Albania
Albanians in Montenegro
Montenegrin First League players
FK Dečić players
FK Iskra Danilovgrad players
Serbian First League players
Serbian SuperLiga players
FK Javor Ivanjica players
Tercera División players
AD Almudévar players
Kategoria Superiore players
FK Kukësi players